Decapterus is a genus of marine fishes of jack family, Carangidae, commonly known as mackerel scads, round scads, or horse mackerel. They are found throughout the world.

Species
Currently, 10 or 12 recognized species are found in this genus:
 Decapterus akaadsi (T. Abe), 1958
 Decapterus koheru (Hector, 1875) (koheru)
 Decapterus kurroides (Bleeker, 1855) (redtail scad)
 Decapterus macarellus (G. Cuvier, 1833) (mackerel scad)
 Decapterus macrosoma (Bleeker, 1851) (shortfin scad)
 Decapterus maruadsi (Temminck & Schlegel, 1843) (Japanese scad)
 Decapterus muroadsi (Temminck & Schlegel, 1844) (amberstripe scad)
 Decapterus punctatus (G. Cuvier, 1829) (round scad)
 Decapterus russelli (Rüppell, 1830) (Indian scad)
 Decapterus tabl (Berry, 1968) (roughear scad)
 Decapterus smithvanizi (Seishi Kimura, Katahira & Kuriiwa, 2013) 
 Decapterus scombrinus (Valenciennes, 1846) (Mexican scad)

References

External links

Hawaiian-style decapterus fishing trials in Tonga

 
Caranginae
Taxa named by Pieter Bleeker
Marine fish genera